Dado is the district center of Zana Khan district, Afghanistan.

The town is located within the heartland of the Andar tribe of Ghilji Pashtuns.

Climate
Dado has a humid continental climate (Köppen climate classification: Dsb) with warm, dry summers and cold, snowy winters.

See also
 Ghazni Province

References

Populated places in Ghazni Province